Maya Jane Coles is a music producer, audio engineer and DJ based in the United Kingdom, born in London of British and Japanese descent. Under her real name, she mostly composes and plays techno music, while her alias Nocturnal Sunshine creates darker, more bass-driven productions with a heavy hip-hop and dub influence. She was previously part of an electronic dub duo called She Is Danger with Lena Cullen.

Biography

Debut 
Coles began making music as a teenager, learning to produce music using the Cubase software program when she was 15. She first produced hip-hop and trip hop. A few years later, she released her first two records on Dogmatik Records, in 2008 and 2009, which were more house music-based.

Career 
Having already remixed acts such as Massive Attack and Gorillaz with her duo She Is Danger, Coles gained breakthrough exposure in 2010, when she released a four-track EP on Franck Roger's label, Real Tone Records. She was then named by DJ Mag as one of the best newcomers that year, as her track "What They Say", taken from her eponymous EP, was also one of the most playlisted by DJs on Resident Advisor.

In 2011, she featured in many specialised magazines, such as Mixmag. BBC Radio 1 invited her to record an Essential Mix of her own, which was later nominated for Essential Mix of the Year 2011. Later on that year, she was voted  'Best Newcomer 2011' at the Ibiza DJ Awards 2011 and came ninth place in Resident Advisor's annual DJ ranking.

In 2012, she won 'Best House/Garage/Deep House' track at the Miami Winter Music Conference 2012,  'Staff Pick: Artist of the year 2011' at the Beatport Awards, DJ Mags 'Producer of the Year 2011', Mixmag's 'Best Breakthrough DJ 2011', FACT's 'Female Artist 2011', and Symphonic Distribution's 'Artist of the Year 2012'

Later in the year, Coles was invited to record a mix for the DJ Kicks collection. The volume she produced was released in April, and obtained a favourable reception from specialised media. In November, Rolling Stone placed Coles at number 15 on its list of the world's 25 most influential DJs.

Maya was later invited back to record a second BBC Radio 1 Essential Mix in 2013.

Coles' début album Comfort was on her own I/AM/ME label and Kobalt Label Services internationally in summer 2013. It featured guest appearances from artists such as Tricky, Miss Kittin, Nadine Shah, Alpines, Thomas Knights and Karin Park.

She also produced Fabric 75 (released April 2014), the 75th edition of London nightclub Fabric's monthly compilation album.

In late 2014, the title track of Coles' 2010 EP What They Say was sampled in the Nicki Minaj song "Truffle Butter", a collaborative track with Drake and Lil Wayne from her album The Pinkprint.

In 2017, Coles released her second album, Take Flight, on her own label, I/AM/ME. The 24-track album peaked at number 37 in the overall UK albums chart during the week of release, number 26 in the Independent label chart and number 15 in the Billboard Dance and Electronic Album Sales Chart. The album received immense support, receiving a 72% score on Metacritic, gaining coverage from a number of high tier publications including Mixmag, Pitchfork and Billboard, as well as receiving DSP support such as a banner on the iTunes Electronic page, a spot in Spotify New Releases, Apple Music New Releases and was named Beatport Artist of the Week. Maya gained 2 'Essential New Tunes' from Pete Tong on BBC Radio 1 for two of her singles from the album, "Cherry Bomb" and "Trails" and to top of her year, she won Best Album and Best Producer at the DJ Mag Best of British Awards 2017 off the back of her Take Flight album. 

2017 also saw Maya gain a number of selected mix placements such as her Essential Mix, which was shortlisted for Essential Mix of the Year, Annie Mac's Mini Mix, Channel 4 Best Before, Beats1 Mix as well as Radio 1 Live in Ibiza. Going into 2018 she also secured a British Airways exclusive mix with her full album also added in flight.

In late-2020, the title track of Coles' 2010 EP What They Say was sampled in the Lady Gaga song "Sour Candy", a collaborative track with BLACKPINK from her album Chromatica.

In 2021, she co-produced one of the songs, "Loving You" on Sting's album, The Bridge.

Discography

As Maya Jane Coles

Studio albums 
2013: Comfort
2017: Take Flight
2021: Night Creature

Compilation albums

Singles and extended plays

Remixes

As Nocturnal Sunshine

Studio albums 
2015: Nocturnal Sunshine
 01. Intro (Holding On)
 02. Believe feat. Chelou
 03. It's Alright
 04. Take Me There
 05. Drive
 06. Footsteps
 07. Down by the River feat. Catnapp
 08. Bass Bin
 09. Can't Hide The Way I Feel
 10. Intergalactic
 11. Skipper
 12. Hotel

2019: Full Circle

 01. Wildfire feat. Catnapp
 02. Gravity feat. Ry X
 03. Possessed feat. Peaches
 04. Pull Up feat. Gangsta Boo & Young M.A
 05. I'm Ready
 06. Ridin' Solo feat. Gangsta Boo
 07. Lessons of Life
 08. Dash feat. CHA$EY JON£S
 09. To the Ground
 10. Fuck Fame feat. CHA$EY JON£S
 11. U&ME
 12. Foundation
 13. Tied Up
 14. Closed Eyes feat. Thomas Knights
 15. Something About the Drama feat. Chelou

Originals

Remixes

As She Is Danger

Remixes

Music videos

References

External links 

English audio engineers
English record producers
English house musicians
English people of Japanese descent
English women DJs
Electronic dance music DJs
DJs from London
Dubstep musicians
Dubtronica musicians
Living people
English women in electronic music
Deep house musicians
Year of birth missing (living people)